Martin Provost (born 13 May 1957) is a French film director, writer and actor. He wrote and directed films such as Séraphine and Le Ventre de Juliette. Violette, his 2013 biographical drama about author Violette Leduc, was screened in the Special Presentation section at the 2013 Toronto International Film Festival.

Filmography

Published works
1992: Aime-moi vite 
2007: Léger, humain, pardonnable
2009: La Rousse Péteuse 
2010: Bifteck

References

External links

French film directors
Living people
French male screenwriters
French screenwriters
1957 births
French male film actors
French male television actors
Film people from Brest, France